Padamangalam Nair is one of the subcastes belonging to the Nair community in Kerala, India.

Nair
Tamil society